The 6th Kazakhstan President Cup was played from May 9 to May 13, 2013 in Astana. 8 youth teams participated in the tournament (players were born no earlier than 1997.)

Participants

Venues 
All games took place in the Astana Arena.

Format 
The tournament was held in two stages. In the first stage, eight teams were divided into two groups (A and B). The first stage was held on a round robin basis. The winners of the groups advanced to the final, while the group runners-up met to determine third place.

Group stage
All times UTC+6

Group A

Group B

Match for the 7th place

Match for the 5th place

Bronze medal match

Final

Statistics

Goalscorers 

4 goals

  Nika Kvantaliani

3 goals

  Shahban Jabrailov

2 goals

  Maimaititusong Muzaiper
  Giorgi Arabidze
  Helam Soltanpur
  Vladislav Vasilyev
  Viktor Kelm
  Edvinas Baniulis

1 goal

  Roman Huseynov
  Elnur Jafarov
   Bolat Tynybek
   Sadi Mukanov
   Edige Oralbai
   Aibolat Makuov
   Abai Saifullin
  Talafuhan Yirmake
  Erhiati Kuerban
  Rati Ardazashvili
  Bager Niari
  Vahid Aftari
  Mima Dagestani
  Valeri Andreyev
  Rashid Lyukhai
  Maxim Gladchenko
  Maxim Kotov
  Bakai Nuridinov
  Giedrius Maculevičius
  Donela Dominicas

Awards 
The best player of the tournament
 Vladislav Vasilyev
Goalscorer of the tournament
 Nika Kvantaliani (4 goals)
The best goalkeeper of the tournament
 Oleg Grubov
The best defender of the tournament
 Ričardas Šveikauskas 
The best midfielder of the tournament
 Roman Huseynov
The best forward of the tournament
 Vahid Aftari

Prize money 
According to the FFK, the prize fund was US$20,000. The teams which finished 1st, 2nd and 3rd received, respectively, 10,000, 6,000 and 4,000 dollars.

References 

2013
2013 in Kazakhstani football
2013 in youth association football